The Virginia House of Delegates election of 2017 was held on Tuesday, November 7. All 100 seats in the Virginia House of Delegates were contested. The Republican Party held a 66–34 majority in the House of Delegates before the election but lost 15 seats to the Democratic Party, resulting in the Republicans holding a 50–49 advantage. After a recount, the result of the election in the 94th district was called a tie. The candidate to hold the seat was determined by random drawing on January 4, 2018, which resulted in the Republicans holding a 51–49 majority.

The election was marred by electoral irregularities, such as robocalls falsely telling voters their polling places had changed and voters being assigned to the wrong district. These irregularities led to lawsuits and a delay in the certification of the election results. Several candidates filed for recounts, one of which changed the result, the first time in almost 30 years that a recount in a Virginia election had done so. That recount's results were not certified, however, due to a questionable ballot; a tie was declared and a random drawing gave the seat to the pre-recount leader.

Background 
The election took place during the first term of President Donald Trump, a Republican who won the 2016 presidential election. Democrats fielded a larger number of candidates than usual in hopes of defying Trump. While there were 17 Republican delegates in districts that had voted Clinton, there were no Democrats from districts that had backed Trump. For this reason, Democrats focused more on picking up seats than on defending seats. Early on, it was expected that Republicans would hold the majority, but Democrats became more optimistic following the unexpectedly close result in Kansas's 4th congressional district special election. Likewise, after Jacqueline Smith won the election for Prince William County Clerk of Circuit Court, Republicans expressed concern that Democratic momentum and Republican internal bickering could cause them to lose five to ten seats in the House of Delegates. Democratic state senator Jeremy McPike argued that Smith's victory boded well for Democratic turnout in the state election.

The filing deadline for Republicans and Democrats to participate in the June 13 primary was March 30. There were seven open House seats, as Republicans Dave Albo, Mark Dudenhefer, Peter Farrell, Bill Howell, Jimmie Massie, and Rick Morris, and Democrat Daun Hester all declined to run again. A total of 55 House of Delegates races were contested. 77 Democrats lined up to challenge 49 Republican incumbents. 35 races were uncontested in the general election, with 13 having only a Republican candidate and 22 having only a Democrat.

In the 2017 election, Democrats reported 153,442 donations of $100 or less, whereas Republicans reported 7,332 such donations.

Delegates not running for re-election

Results 
By November 8, the Associated Press called the elections in 96 districts, giving the Democrats a 49–47 advantage but not yet the majority of seats. Upon certification of the election results on November 27, the Republicans held a 51–49 majority. A recount in the 94th district resulted in the Democrats gaining one more seat, causing a 50–50 split. But a three-judge panel declined to certify the result and counted another vote that tied the election, which led to the panel declaring that there was no winner. So the balance of the House of Delegates was at 50–49 in the Republicans' favor until the race was resolved through drawing lots, as per state law. On January 4, 2018, the drawing was held and Republican David Yancey was declared the winner. His opponent, Shelly Simonds, conceded on January 10.

There were several notable candidates who won elections. Democratic candidate Chris Hurst, whose girlfriend was murdered on live television in 2015, defeated Republican incumbent and National Rifle Association-supported Joseph Yost in the 12th district. In the 13th district, Democratic candidate Danica Roem defeated Republican incumbent Bob Marshall to become the first openly transgender candidate to be elected and serve in a state legislative body in the United States. In the 21st and 42nd districts, respectively, Democratic candidates Kelly Fowler and Kathy Tran became the first Asian American women elected to the House of Delegates after defeating Republican incumbent Ron Villanueva and candidate Lolita Mancheno-Smoak. Democratic candidates Elizabeth Guzmán and Hala Ayala defeated Republican incumbents Scott Lingamfelter and Richard Anderson in the 31st and 51st districts, respectively, to also become the first two Hispanic women elected to the House of Delegates. In the 50th district, Lee Carter, the Democratic candidate and a self-described democratic socialist, defeated Republican incumbent and House Majority Whip Jackson Miller. Democratic candidate Dawn M. Adams became the first openly lesbian candidate to be elected to the House of Delegates after defeating Republican incumbent G. Manoli Loupassi in the 68th district.

In the 2017 election, 25 women were elected to the House of Delegates, breaking the previous record of 19 that was set in 2013.

Close races 
Seats where the margin of victory was under 10%:

Overall

By House of Delegates district

Seats that changed hands 
 Republican to Democratic (15)
 2nd district
 10th district
 12th district
 13th district
 21st district
 31st district
 32nd district
 42nd district
 50th district
 51st district
 67th district
 68th district
 72nd district
 73rd district
 85th district

Aftermath

Reaction 
Frank Bruni, a columnist for The New York Times, said the Republican Party should be "scared" as a result of the Virginia elections. Slate writer Mark Stern blamed gerrymandering as the reason why the Democrats did not win a majority in the House of Delegates. Chicago Tribune editorial board member Clarence Page called the election an "unmistakable anti-Trump backlash."

Misinformation 
On November 7, a Twitter account called "MAGA Mike King" was suspended after it tweeted more than a dozen times a graphic purportedly instructing Virginians on how to vote by text. On the same day, Harry Wiggins, the chair of the Prince William County Democratic Committee, told The Intercept that voters in his county were receiving robocalls falsely telling them their polling places had changed.

Irregularities 
On November 13, the NAACP Legal Defense and Educational Fund filed a lawsuit in the state court alleging that conflicting and misleading instructions from the Stafford County Electoral Board would ultimately prevent provisional ballots from being counted. Their lawsuit was thrown out on November 14 by judge Victoria Willis because it was not clear that the two voters named as plaintiffs had been harmed. On November 20, the Virginia State Board of Elections voted unanimously to delay certification of elections in the 28th and 88th districts after Elections Commissioner Edgardo Cortés announced that in April 2016, Fredericksburg registrar Juanita Pitchford erroneously assigned 83 voters from the 28th to the 88th.

On November 22, federal judge T. S. Ellis III rejected the Virginia Democratic Party's bid to halt the Virginia State Board of Elections from certifying the vote totals in the 28th district. After certifying the final results on November 27, Virginia State Board of Elections Chairman James Alcorn acknowledged the possibility of other voters being erroneously assigned to the wrong district. On December 7, the Democrats filed an amended complaint that asked the judge to order the state to decertify the election, block Republican candidate Robert Thomas from being seated as a delegate when the General Assembly convenes in January, and hold a new election for the seat.

On January 2, 2018, it was reported that the Virginia Department of Elections, Speaker Bill Howell, and Fredericksburg's Electoral Board knew there were problems with voters assigned to the wrong House districts in the Fredericksburg area since at least early 2015.

Recounts 
On November 29, Democratic candidates Shelly Simonds and Donte Tanner filed for recounts in the 94th and 40th districts, respectively. On November 30, Republican incumbent Manoli Loupassi, who lost to Democratic candidate Dawn Adams, filed for a recount in the 68th district. On December 3, Democratic candidate Joshua Cole filed a request for a recount in the 28th district. On December 14, Republican incumbent Tim Hugo won the recount in the 40th district, defeating Donte Tanner by 99 votes. On December 20, Adams' victory over Loupassi was confirmed by the recount. On December 21, Republican candidate Robert Thomas defeated Joshua Cole in the recount of the 28th district election.

On December 19, the recount in the 94th district determined that Simonds defeated Republican incumbent David Yancey by one vote, which ended the 18-year Republican majority in the House of Delegates and created an even 50–50 split. It was the first time in almost thirty years that a recount changed an election result in Virginia. However, a three-judge panel declined to certify the results, citing a questionable ballot that had previously not been counted, which they deemed should be counted in favor of the Republican instead. Judge Bryant Sugg said, "The court declares there is no winner in this election." In the event of a tie in a House of Delegates election, state law says the winner is chosen by lot. On December 21, James Alcorn tweeted that a random drawing would occur on December 27.

On December 26, the drawing was postponed after Simonds filed a legal motion challenging the validity of a ballot counted in Yancey's favor. On December 28 on CNN's New Day, Simonds said, "I do have a problem with doing a game of chance now, because I do feel now I did win fair and square during the recount." On December 29, Alcorn tweeted, "The State Board of Elections will convene on Thursday, January 4 at 11:00 am. Unless the court system intervenes, the Board will draw a winner for [the 94th district]." In the legal case, Yancey filed paperwork arguing that Simonds had presented no grounds for a recount court to reconsider its decision. On January 3, 2018, the recount panel rejected Simonds' motion, allowing the random draw to proceed as planned. On January 4, the tie-breaking drawing was held and Yancey was the winner. Simonds conceded on January 10.

Speakership 
If the Republicans retained a majority in the House of Delegates, Kirk Cox was in line to become speaker. On December 8, Kenneth R. Plum, a Democrat and the most senior member of the House of Delegates, voiced the possibility of him becoming speaker while minority leader David Toscano is named the majority leader. In an email disclosed by The Washington Post on December 27, Toscano accused the Republicans of trying "to undermine [Democratic] unity by offering deals to various members in exchange [for] a vote for Speaker." Toscano also warned his fellow Democratic delegates against calling in sick when the legislature convenes or taking an ill-timed bathroom break during the floor session, fearing that in an evenly split chamber, the Republicans might seize any opportunity to call a vote and take control. After the Republicans retained a majority in the House of Delegates, Cox was elected speaker by a vote of 98–0 on January 10, 2018. Cox didn't vote for himself, and one Democratic delegate didn't appear to be in the chamber.

See also 
 United States elections, 2017
 Virginia elections, 2017
 Virginia gubernatorial election, 2017
 Virginia lieutenant gubernatorial election, 2017
 Virginia Attorney General election, 2017

References 

Virginia House of Delegates
House of Delegates
Virginia House of Delegates elections
Virginia House of Delegates